is a district located in Hyōgo Prefecture, Japan.

As of the April 1, 2005 merger (but using 2003 population statistics), the district has an estimated population of 40,084 and a density of 66 persons per km2. The total area is 610.02 km2.

Towns and villages
Kami
Shin'onsen

Mergers
On April 1, 2005 the towns of Mikata and Muraoka merged with the town of Kasumi, from Kinosaki District, to form the new town of Kami.
On October 1, 2005 the towns of Hamasaka and Onsen merged to form the town of Shin'onsen.

Points of interest
 Tajima Plateau Botanical Gardens
 Antaiji Zen monastery

References

Districts in Hyōgo Prefecture